An episode is a part of a dramatic work, such as a serial radio, podcast, or television program.

Episode may also refer to:
 Episode (film), a 1935 Austrian film by Walter Reisch
 Episode (Gen Hoshino album), a 2011 album by Gen Hoshino
 Episode (music), a term for a section in music
 Episode (Stratovarius album), a 1996 album by Stratovarius
 Episode (video game), an interactive storytelling game
 Episode (Zack Tabudlo album), a 2021 album by Zack Tabudlo
 Episode, a fictional character from the Monogatari series of novels and anime

See also
Episodes (disambiguation)